Sir Michael James Kerry KCB QC MA (5 August 1923 – 11 May 2012) was the holder of the official titles of Her Majesty's Procurator General and Treasury Solicitor from 1980 to 1984.

Michael James Kerry was educated at Rugby School and St John's College, Oxford. During the Second World War, he served as an RAF pilot-officer and was trained in Japanese and codebreaking at the School of Oriental and African Studies and Bletchley Park. In June 1944 he went to the Wireless Experimental Centre in Delhi, India. He was called to the Bar by Lincoln's Inn in 1949 and joined the Solicitor's Department of the then Board of Trade in 1951. Following involvement with the case of the wreck of the Torrey Canyon in 1967, he was the UK representative to the Inter-Governmental Maritime Consultative Organization and was a founder member of its Legal Committee.

Michael Kerry was made a Companion of the Order of the Bath in 1976 and a Knight Commander of the Order of the Bath in the New Year Honours of 1983. He was appointed Queen's Counsel in 1984. After retiring from the Government Legal Service in 1984, Sir Michael became the first dedicated legal adviser to GCHQ 1984–1990.

Sir Michael was an Honorary Fellow of St John's College, Oxford.

References

External links 

Burke's Peerage

1923 births
2012 deaths
People educated at Rugby School
Alumni of St John's College, Oxford
Royal Air Force personnel of World War II
Treasury Solicitors
Knights Commander of the Order of the Bath
English King's Counsel
Members of Lincoln's Inn
GCHQ people
20th-century English lawyers